Trudy Desmond (October 11, 1945 – 19 February 1999) was a Canadian jazz singer.

Career
After moving from New York to Toronto, she worked as an actress, interior designer, club manager, and theatrical producer. She was one of the 16 original members of the Dr. Music ensemble led by Doug Riley.

She performed in concert with the Don Thompson Quartet (Ed Bickert on guitar, bassist Paul Novotny, and drummer John Sumner) during the Sound of Toronto Jazz Series at the Ontario Science Centre on January 23, 1989.

Discography
 Tailor Made (The Jazz Alliance, 1992)
 RSVP (Jazz Alliance, 1994)
 Make Me Rainbows (Koch, 1995)
 My One and Only (Justin Time, 1998)

References

External Links
 
 

1999 deaths
1945 births
20th-century Canadian women singers
Cabaret singers
Canadian women jazz singers
Justin Time Records artists